Ntungamo–Rukungiri Road is in the Western Region of Uganda, connecting the towns of Ntungamo in Ntungamo District with Rukungiri in Rukungiri District.

Location
The road starts at Ntungamo, on the Mbarara–Ntungamo–Kabale–Katuna Road. The coordinates of the road, about equidistant from Kagamba and Rukungiri, are 0°49'57.0"S, 30°02'25.0"E (Latitude:-0.832499; Longitude:30.040267).

Upgrading to bitumen
Prior to 2004, the road was gravel surfaced and in a poor state. In that year, the government of Uganda upgraded the road to grade II bitumen surface with shoulders, drainage channels, and culverts.

References

External links
 Uganda National Road Authority Homepage
  Police bribery in Ntungamo, Rukungiri!

Roads in Uganda
Ntungamo District
Rukungiri District
Western Region, Uganda